The top level of the English football league system from its formation in 1888 was the Football League, until the introduction of a Second Division in 1892 when it became known as the  Football League First Division. This remained the top level of English football until 1992 when it was replaced by the Premier League. The role of the manager is to select the squad during the league season, develop the tactics of the team and manage potential issues within the squad. Due to the prestige of winning the league championship, the pressures on managers to succeed can be great.

William Sudell managed Preston North End to the inaugural championship in 1888–89, which they retained the following season, with Suddell becoming the first manager to win multiple championships. Since then, a further 24 managers have won the championship on more than one occasion. Alex Ferguson won 13 league championships as manager of Manchester United, which is the most a manager has won. George Ramsay and Bob Paisley won six league championships as managers of Aston Villa and Liverpool respectively. Nine managers — Ted Drake, Bill Nicholson, Alf Ramsey, Joe Mercer, Dave Mackay, Bob Paisley, Howard Kendall, Kenny Dalglish and George Graham – have won the championship as a player and a manager. Dalglish is the only one to have won the championship as a player-manager, a feat he achieved in the 1985–86, 1987–88 and 1989–90 seasons.

English managers have won the most championships, with a total of 58 championships won by 38 different managers. Scottish managers are next with 37 championships won by 10 different managers and Italian and Spanish managers are joint third with four titles from four and one managers respectively. The last English manager to win the championship was Howard Wilkinson, who led Leeds United to victory in the 1991–92 season. Arsène Wenger became the first manager from outside the British Isles to win the championship when he guided Arsenal to the 1997–98 Premier League title.

Managers

By individual

Won the League as a player and a manager

By nationality

Notes

References

Bibliography
 

 

Football managers in England
winners